Godspeed You! Black Emperor (sometimes abbreviated to GY!BE or Godspeed) is a Canadian post-rock band which originated in Montreal, Quebec in 1994. The group releases recordings through Constellation, an independent record label also located in Montreal. After the release of their debut album in 1997, the group toured regularly from 1998 to 2003. Their second album, 2000's Lift Your Skinny Fists Like Antennas to Heaven, received critical acclaim and has been named as one of the best albums of the decade. In 2003, the band announced an indefinite hiatus in order for members to pursue other musical interests. In the intervening period, the group was occasionally rumored to have broken up, but finally reconvened for a tour which began in late 2010. Since reforming, they have released four more albums, the most recent being G_d's Pee at State's End! in April 2021.

The band has gained a dedicated cult following and remains very influential in the post-rock genre. Their music, mainly instrumental in nature, has been noted for its contrasts between ambient soundscapes and chaotic crescendos; use of field recordings and spoken word monologues; and focus on dystopian, anarchist and anti-war themes. In September 2013, their fourth album and their comeback release after 10 years, 'Allelujah! Don't Bend! Ascend!, won the 2013 Polaris Music Prize.

One of the band's best known songs, "East Hastings", from their 1997 album F♯ A♯ ∞, was used in the 2002 film 28 Days Later. However, it does not appear on the film's soundtrack because the rights to the song could not be obtained.

History
Godspeed You! Black Emperor was formed in 1994 in Montreal, Quebec, by Efrim Menuck (guitar), Mike Moya (guitar), and Mauro Pezzente (bass). The band took its name from God Speed You! Black Emperor, a 1976 Japanese black-and-white documentary by director Mitsuo Yanagimachi, which follows the exploits of a Japanese biker gang, the Black Emperors. The band initially assembled after being offered a supporting act for another local band named Steak 72. Thereafter, the trio performed live on a few separate occasions. Previously, the name "God Speed You Black Emperor!" had been used by Menuck on a limited cassette entitled All Lights Fucked on the Hairy Amp Drooling that had been recorded the year prior, with limited contributions by Pezzente on bass, although it would not be until 1994 that the actual band formed.

The band quickly expanded and continued to perform live. According to Menuck, joining the group was quite simple: "It was like if anyone knew anybody who played an instrument and seemed like an okay person, they would sort of join up." In short order, the group's numbers ebbed and flowed. Local musicians would often join the band for a handful of performances, then depart. The revolving door nature of the group's membership frequently caused it strain before the release of F♯ A♯ ∞.  After that release, the group stabilized around a nine-person lineup with Menuck, Moya and David Bryant on guitars, Pezzente and Thierry Amar on bass guitars, Aidan Girt and Bruce Cawdron on drums, and Sophie Trudeau and Norsola Johnson on violin and cello respectively.  Moya would depart in 1998 to focus on HṚṢṬA, being replaced by Roger Tellier-Craig of Fly Pan Am.

Although various members of the band are often pinned down as anarchists, no one in the band explicitly subscribed to this label; however, as of 2014, Menuck was calling himself an anarchist. In any case, there is a strong political component to the band's music. Much of the band's music exudes left-wing themes. For example, the liner notes to Yanqui U.X.O. describe the song "09-15-00" as "Ariel Sharon surrounded by 1,000 Israeli soldiers marching on al-Haram Ash-Sharif & provoking another Intifada," and the back cover of that album depicts the relationships of several major record labels to the military–industrial complex. Several of its songs also incorporate voice samples which express political sentiments, most notably "The Dead Flag Blues" (on F♯ A♯ ∞) and "BBF3" (on Slow Riot for New Zerø Kanada).

Members of the group have formed a number of side projects, including Thee Silver Mt. Zion Memorial Orchestra & Tra-La-La Band, Fly Pan Am, HṚṢṬA, Esmerine, and Set Fire to Flames.

The band released the CD versions of its first two albums and EP on the Kranky record label, and released the LPs through Constellation Records. All editions of their subsequent studio material have been released through Constellation.

In 2004, long-time guitarist Roger Tellier-Craig left the band on amicable terms to devote more time to Fly Pan Am.

The group was once misconstrued as being a band of terrorists. After stopping at a local gas station for fuel in the town of Ardmore, Oklahoma, during their 2003 tour of the United States, the station attendant working that day believed the group of Canadians to be terrorists. She quickly passed a note to another customer asking them to call the police. When the local police appeared, the group was held until it could be questioned by the FBI. Although the police were suspicious of the band's anti-government documents and some photos it had (such as those of oil rigs), they found no incriminating evidence.  After background checks were run, the ensemble was released from custody and continued on its way to its next show in Saint Louis. Efrim Menuck later spoke to the crowd during their appearance in Missouri about what happened to them and speculated that their origin was a motive for being released quickly ("It's a good thing we're nice white kids from Canada"). The incident was mentioned in Michael Moore's book Dude, Where's My Country?.

In 2010, the band reported it was reuniting for an All Tomorrow's Parties music event in the UK as well as further US dates. Mike Moya re-joined the band for the reunion, while original cellist Norsola Johnson declined to participate. The band played a full North American and European tour in 2011, and more dates in the UK including an appearance at the ATP 'I'll Be Your Mirror' music festival in London.

The following year the band appeared at the Pitchfork Music Festival in Chicago and the 2012 All Tomorrow's Parties I'll Be Your Mirror festival in New York. Drummer Timothy Herzog began touring with the band after the departure of Bruce Cawdron.

In 2013, the band won the Polaris Music Prize, but it criticized the cost of the ceremony during the time of austerity, stating, "Maybe the next celebration should happen in a cruddier hall, without the corporate banners and culture overlords."

On March 31, 2015, Godspeed You! Black Emperor released its fifth album, Asunder, Sweet and Other Distress. On September 22, 2017, the group released its sixth album, Luciferian Towers.

In early March 2021, the band announced its seventh album, G_d's Pee at State's End! through Constellation Records.

In February 2022, a copy of All Lights Fucked on the Hairy Amp Drooling was posted to 4chan's music board. The band eventually uploaded the full audio of the tape to its official Bandcamp page on February 14.

Live concerts
Film loop projections are an important aspect of the group's live show, explained by Efrim Menuck as "[putting] the whole into context".

The band is taper-friendly; they allow audience members to record their live performances, fans often release new material before the band makes an official recording.

The band toured Australia/New Zealand for the first time in February 2013, including a performance at the All Tomorrow's Parties 'I'll Be Your Mirror' festival in Melbourne on February 16.

The band toured China for the first time in April 2013, giving performances in Shanghai and Beijing, and revisited China in March 2016.

The band supported Nine Inch Nails on its Tension tour in October 2013, starting at the TD Garden in Boston on October 11.

After a break for much of 2014 the band embarked on a busy schedule of concert and festival dates across North America, Europe and around the world during 2015 and 2016. Two new songs were previewed in many of the shows picking up the fan titles "Buildings" and "Railroads" from the projections that accompanied them. The band also lent live performances of some of their older and current tracks to a revival of the 2005 work "monumental", by Canadian dance troupe, Holy Body Tattoo during 2016.

Members

Current
Efrim Menuck – guitar, tape loops, keyboards (1994–2003, 2010–present)
Mauro Pezzente – bass guitar (1994–2003, 2010–present)
Mike Moya – guitar (1994–1998, 2010–present)
Thierry Amar – double bass, bass guitar (1997–2003, 2010–present)
David Bryant – guitar, tape loops (1997–2003, 2010–present)
Aidan Girt – drums, percussion (1997–2003, 2010–present)
Sophie Trudeau – violin (1997–2003, 2010–present)
Karl Lemieux – film projections (2010–present)
Timothy Herzog – drums, percussion (2012–present)
Philippe Leonard – film projections (2015–present)

Former
Mark Littlefair – film projections (1994–2000)
Thea Pratt – French horn (1995–1997)
Bruce Cawdron – drums, percussion  (1997–2003, 2010–2012)
Norsola Johnson – cello (1997–2003)
Grayson Walker – accordion (1997)
Christophe - violin (1997)
Roger Tellier-Craig – guitar (1998–2003)
Peter Harry Hill – bagpipes (1997)
Fluffy Erskine – film projections (2000–2003)

Timeline

Discography

Studio albums
F♯ A♯ ∞ (1997)
Lift Your Skinny Fists Like Antennas to Heaven (2000)
Yanqui U.X.O. (2002)
'Allelujah! Don't Bend! Ascend! (2012)
Asunder, Sweet and Other Distress (2015)
Luciferian Towers (2017)
G_d's Pee at State's End! (2021)

References

External links

 
 Godspeed You! Black Emperor on Constellation Records
 

Musical groups established in 1994
Musical groups disestablished in 2003
Musical groups reestablished in 2010
Musical groups from Montreal
Canadian progressive rock groups
Canadian post-rock groups
Musical collectives
Anti-corporate activism
Constellation Records (Canada) artists
Polaris Music Prize winners
1994 establishments in Quebec